Private First Class Manuel Pérez Jr. (March 3, 1923 – March 14, 1945) was a United States Army soldier who posthumously received the Medal of Honor, the United States' highest military decoration, for his actions in Battle of Luzon during the Philippines campaign of World War II.

Early years
Pérez was a Mexican-American born in Oklahoma City. As a young boy, he moved to Chicago, Illinois, where he was raised by his father, Manuel Pérez Sr., and his paternal grandmother. There he received his primary and secondary education. He worked for Best Foods before joining the United States Army upon the outbreak of World War II. After his basic training, the Army sent him to paratrooper school.

World War II
Japanese forces had invaded the Philippine islands and had under its control all of the U.S. Military Installations including Fort William McKinley which was located just south of Manila the capital. Fort William McKinley was where USAFFE (United States Army Forces - Far East) had its headquarters for the Philippine Department and the Philippine Division. The bulk of the Philippine Division was stationed here and this was where, under the National Defense Act of 1935, specialized artillery training was conducted.

In 1945, Pérez was sent to the Philippines and assigned to Company A 511th Parachute Infantry, 11th Airborne Division whose mission was to take Fort William McKinley.  On February 13, as the 11th Airborne Division approached the fort, it encountered a strong enemy fortified sector. The sector was composed of cement pillboxes armed with .50-caliber dual-purpose machineguns which defended the entrance to the fort.

Upon realizing that the pillboxes (Blockhouses) were preventing the advance of his division, Pérez took it upon himself to charge the fortifications and blast them away with grenades. Due to his actions, which resulted in 18 enemy deaths, his unit was able to advance.

A month later, while on the road to Santo Tomas in Southern Luzon, Private Perez was killed by a sniper.

Medal of Honor citation
Manuel Pérez Jr. was posthumously awarded the Medal of Honor on December 27, 1945.

Honors
Pérez was buried with full military honors at Fairlawn Cemetery which is located in Oklahoma City, Oklahoma.  The state government of Illinois honored the memory of Perez by naming a plaza located in Chicago's Little Village Square and a school after him.  The Department of the Army the reserve center of the 221st Unit Army Hospital in Oklahoma City, the Manuel Perez Jr Reserve Center.

Date of death
His grave at Fairlawn Cemetery shows a date of death as March 14, 1945, a date found in the casualty list for the 511th PIR and division historian Lt. Gen. E.M. Flanagan.

Awards and recognitions
Among Pérez's decorations and medals were the following:

See also

 List of Medal of Honor recipients
 List of Medal of Honor recipients for World War II
 Hispanic Medal of Honor recipients
 Hispanic Americans in World War II

References

External links
  
 
 

1923 births
1945 deaths
United States Army Medal of Honor recipients
United States Army soldiers
American people of Mexican descent
United States Army personnel killed in World War II
World War II recipients of the Medal of Honor
Military personnel from Oklahoma
People from Oklahoma City